The 2012 Bet-at-home Cup Kitzbühel was a men's tennis tournament played on outdoor clay courts. It was the 68th edition of the Austrian Open Kitzbühel, as part of the World Tour 250 series of the 2012 ATP World Tour. It took place at the Tennis stadium Kitzbühel in Kitzbühel Austria, from 22 July until 28 July 2012. Robin Haase won the singles title.

Singles main draw entrants

Seeds

 1 Seedings based on the July 16, 2012 rankings.

Other entrants
The following players received wildcards into the singles main draw:
  Martin Fischer
  Andreas Haider-Maurer
  Dominic Thiem

The following players received entry from the qualifying draw:
  Attila Balázs
  Pavol Červenák
  Philipp Oswald
  Antonio Veić

Withdrawals
  Thomaz Bellucci (fatigue)
  Jérémy Chardy
  Juan Ignacio Chela
  Nikolay Davydenko
  Juan Carlos Ferrero
  Fabio Fognini
  Tommy Haas (fatigue)
  Ivo Karlović
  Łukasz Kubot
  Édouard Roger-Vasselin (shoulder injury)
  Adrian Ungur

Doubles main draw entrants

Seeds

 Rankings are as of July 16, 2012

Other entrants
The following pairs received wildcards into the doubles main draw:
  Martin Fischer /  Philipp Oswald
  Philipp Kohlschreiber /  Stephan Tumphart

Finals

Singles

 Robin Haase defeated  Philipp Kohlschreiber, 6–7(2–7), 6–3, 6–2

Doubles

 František Čermák /  Julian Knowle defeated  Dustin Brown /  Paul Hanley, 7–6(7–4), 3–6, [12–10]

References

External links
 Official website

Bet-at-home Cup Kitzbuhel
Austrian Open Kitzbühel
2012 in Austrian tennis